Stauffer Communications was a privately held media corporation based in Topeka, Kansas, that owned many publications and broadcast outlets, including the Topeka Capital-Journal and WIBW, WIBW-FM, and WIBW-TV. The company operated from 1930 to 1995.

History 
The company was founded by Oscar S. Stauffer in 1930 as Stauffer Publications. Oscar Stauffer had started a journalism career at the Emporia Gazette and Kansas City Star, and in 1915 had become the publisher of the Peabody Gazette-Hearld in Peabody, Kansas until 1922. When Stauffer died at age 95 in 1982 the company had grown to include 31 newspapers and broadcast companies in 11 states. Oscar Stauffer's son John H. Stauffer became head of the company in 1992.

In 1994, the company arranged to sell its properties to Morris Communications of Augusta, Georgia. The transaction was completed in 1995 for $275 million. At the time of its sale, Stauffer's multi-state operations included 20 daily newspapers, 11 radio stations, 3 magazines, and the broadcast rights to Kansas City Royals baseball.  As a condition of the sale, Morris had to sell Stauffer's television holdings.  Most of the former Stauffer television holdings, including WIBW-TV, were sold to Benedek Broadcasting in 1996.  Morris also sold off all of Stauffer's magazines and its insurance and alarm operations.

Mary Stauffer Brownback, daughter of John Stauffer and granddaughter of Oscar Stauffer, is married to former U.S. Senator and Kansas Governor Sam Brownback.

Properties

Newspapers

Florida
News Chief (Florida)

Kansas
Grit (newspaper) (national)
The Newton Kansan (Kansas)
The Topeka Capital-Journal (Kansas)
Dodge City Daily Globe (Kansas)
The Morning Sun (Pittsburg) (Kansas)
The Arkansas City Traveler (Kansas)
Peabody Gazette-Bulletin (Kansas)

Michigan
The Holland Sentinel (Michigan)
Hillsdale Daily News (Michigan)

Minnesota
Brainerd Dispatch (Minnesota)

Missouri
The Examiner (Missouri) (Missouri)
Maryville Daily Forum (Missouri)
Hannibal Courier-Post (Missouri)

Nebraska
Grand Island Independent (Nebraska)
York News-Times (Nebraska)
Beatrice Daily Sun (Nebraska)

Oklahoma
The Shawnee News-Star (Oklahoma)
The Ardmoreite (Oklahoma)

South Dakota
The Brookings Register (South Dakota)
Yankton Press & Dakotan (South Dakota)

Tennessee
The Oak Ridger (Tennessee)

Radio
KRNT (Iowa)
KRNQ-FM (Iowa)

Television
KGWN-TV, Cheyenne, Wyoming
KMIZ, Columbia, Missouri
WIBW-TV, Topeka
KCOY-TV, Santa Maria, California
KGNC-TV, Amarillo, Texas
KGWC-TV, Casper, Wyoming

References

Companies based in Topeka, Kansas
Mass media companies disestablished in 1995
Defunct companies based in Kansas
Defunct broadcasting companies of the United States
Defunct mass media companies of the United States
1930 establishments in Kansas
Mass media companies established in 1930
American companies established in 1930